Detective K: Secret of the Lost Island (lit. "Joseon Detective: The Disappearance of the Laborer's Daughter") is a 2015 South Korean period comedy adventure film directed by Kim Sok-yun. It is the sequel to 2011's Detective K: Secret of the Virtuous Widow and is the 9th highest grossing film of 2015.

A sequel, titled Detective K: Secret of the Living Dead, was released on February 8, 2018.

Synopsis
Set in Joseon in the year 1795, nobleman, inventor and master sleuth Kim Min and his sidekick Seo-pil investigate a silver counterfeiting ring, which may be linked to the disappearance of hundreds of girls.

Cast
Kim Myung-min as Kim Min, "Detective K"
Oh Dal-su as Han Seo-pil
Lee Yeon-hee as Hisako
Jo Kwan-woo as Musician Jo 
Jung Won-joong as Senior colleague
Lee Chae-eun as Da-hae 
Hwang Chae-won as Do-hae 
Hwang Jeong-min as Sakura 
Woo Hyun as Mr. Bang 
Choi Moo-sung as Boss 
Park Soo-young as Official request man (cameo)
Kim Won-hae as Sato (cameo)
Hyun Woo as Vampire (cameo)

Box office
The film was released on February 11, 2015. It topped the box office on its opening weekend, earning  from 960,000 admissions over five days. By the end of its theatrical run, it recorded 3,872,025 admissions, grossing , making it the 9th highest grossing film of 2015.

References

External links
 
Detective K: Secret of the Lost Island at Showbox

2015 films
South Korean adventure comedy films
2010s adventure comedy films
South Korean detective films
Films set in 1795
2010s South Korean films